Benjamin Chukwukelo Uzoh (born March 18, 1988) is a Nigerian-American professional basketball player who plays for Marinos of the Venezuelan SuperLiga.

College career
Uzoh played for the Tulsa Golden Hurricane over his four-year college basketball career.

Uzoh is the only player in school history to be ranked top 10 among points, rebounds, assists, steals and blocks. He's a three time All-Conference USA recipient including his selection to the first team his senior year. He started in 140 games out 141 game in his college career.

Professional career
In the summer of 2010, Uzoh earned Portsmouth Invitational Tournament All Third Team.

After going undrafted in the 2010 NBA Draft, Uzoh signed a partially guaranteed contract with the New Jersey Nets of the National Basketball Association. On January 5, 2011, Uzoh was given a guaranteed contract to play out the rest of the year in New Jersey. He was briefly assigned to the Springfield Armor of the NBA D-League, during the month of March 2011.

In October 2011, he signed a one-year contract with Lokomotiv Kuban of the Russian League, but was released after playing just two games.

On March 27, 2012, he signed a 10-day contract with the Toronto Raptors of the National Basketball Association. On April 16, 2012, the Raptors announced they had signed Ben Uzoh for the remainder of the 2011-2012 season. He recorded a triple-double on April 26, against the Nets, the first by a Raptor in eleven years.

Uzoh joined the Denver Nuggets for their training camp in October 2012, but did not make the team's final roster. He was then acquired by the D-League team the Rio Grande Valley Vipers. However, on November 5, 2012, Uzoh was traded to the Armor for Tim Ohlbrecht.

On October 31, 2013, Uzoh was acquired by the Tulsa 66ers in a trade involving the Iowa Energy and the Springfield Armor. On January 22, 2014, he was traded to the Canton Charge. On March 21, 2014, he was waived by the Charge due to a season-ending injury.

Ben Uzoh went to Nigeria in 2015 where he signed on to play for the Lagos Islanders.

On March 12, 2017, Uzoh signed with Belgian club Okapi Aalstar for the rest of the 2016–17 season.

On February 10, 2018, he signed with Caballeros de Culiacan of the CIBACOPA league in Mexico.

On November 24, 2019, Uzoh signed with Paris Basketball of the LNB Pro B. On January 20, 2020, Paris Basketball and Uzoh jointly decided not to continue their collaboration.

In April 2021, Uzoh signed with the Nigerian team Rivers Hoopers to play in the inaugural season of the Basketball Africa League (BAL). He scored the first-ever points in the BAL in the season opener against Patriots BBC. He also became the first ex-NBA player to play in the newly established competition. The Hoopers were eliminated in the regular season after two losses and one win, with Uzoh averaging a team-leading 14.7 points per game.

In September 2021, Uzoh was on the roster of South African team Cape Town Tigers and helped the team win its first-ever national championship. He recorded 22 points, 5 rebounds and 5 assists in the championship game against Jozi Nuggets.

On July 4, 2022, he signed with Marinos of the Venezuelan SuperLiga.

National team career
Uzoh has played for the Nigerian national basketball team at the 2013, 2015, and 2017 FIBA Men's African Championships. He was also a member of the Nigerian team that participated at the Rio 2016 Olympic Games.

Career statistics

NBA

Regular season

|-
| align="left" | 
| align="left" | New Jersey
| 42 || 0 || 10.4 || .424 || .375 || .589 || 1.5 || 1.6 || 0.3 || 0.2 || 3.8
|-
| align="left" | 
| align="left" | Cleveland
| 2 || 0 || 6.5 || .400 || .000 || .000 || 2.0 || 1.0 || 0.5 || 0.0 || 2.0
|-
| align="left" | 
| align="left" | Toronto
| 16 || 8 || 22.3 || .351 || .000 || .579 || 3.9 || 3.7 || 1.0 || 0.2 || 4.8
|- class="sortbottom"
| style="text-align:center;" colspan="2"| Career 
| 60 || 8 || 13.5 || .395 || .333 || .587 || 2.1 || 2.2 || 0.5 || 0.2 || 4.0

BAL

|-
| style="text-align:left;"|2021
| style="text-align:left;"|Rivers Hoopers
| 3 || 3 || 29.1 || .559 || .000 || .667 || 4.7 || 5.3 || 1.0 || .7 || 14.7
|-
|- class="sortbottom"
| style="text-align:center;" colspan="2"|Career
| 3 || 3 || 29.1 || .559 || .000 || .667 || 4.7 || 5.3 || 1.0 || .7 || 14.7

References

External links
Ben Uzoh at NBA.com
Ben Uzoh at USBasket.com
Ben Uzoh at ESPN.com
Ben Uzoh at Tulsa Golden Hurricanes website

1988 births
Living people
2019 FIBA Basketball World Cup players
African-American basketball players
American expatriate basketball people in Belgium
American expatriate basketball people in Canada
American expatriate basketball people in Russia
American men's basketball players
American sportspeople of Nigerian descent
Basketball players at the 2016 Summer Olympics
Basketball players from Houston
Canton Charge players
Cape Town Tigers players
Cleveland Cavaliers players
New Jersey Nets players
Nigerian expatriate basketball people in Canada
Nigerian expatriate basketball people in Russia
Nigerian expatriate sportspeople in Belgium
Nigerian men's basketball players
Okapi Aalstar players
Olympic basketball players of Nigeria
PBC Lokomotiv-Kuban players
Point guards
Rio Grande Valley Vipers players
Rivers Hoopers players
Basketball players from San Antonio
Springfield Armor players
Toronto Raptors players
Tulsa 66ers players
Tulsa Golden Hurricane men's basketball players
Undrafted National Basketball Association players
21st-century African-American sportspeople
20th-century African-American people
Marinos B.B.C. players